Soemanang Soerjowinoto (EYD: Sumanang Suryowinoto, 1 May 1908 – 13 June 1988) was an Indonesian journalist, politician, and banker.

Born in Yogyakarta, Soemanang entered journalism after working in law for some time, founding his first newspaper in 1937. He was one of the co-founders of the Antara news agency and he was a chief editor of the Pemandangan newspaper during the Japanese occupation of the Dutch East Indies. After Indonesia's independence, he founded the Nasional newspaper, became the first chairman of the Indonesian Journalists Association, and joined the Central Indonesian National Committee, becoming a senator in the United States of Indonesia and later Minister of Economic Affairs under Wilopo's prime ministership. Following this political career, Soemanang served as directors in two banks before becoming an executive director at the International Monetary Fund.

Early life and education
Soemanang was born in Yogyakarta, then part of the Dutch East Indies, on 1 May 1908. He was a descendant of the Pakualaman noble family, and his father was a mid-ranking official in the Yogyakarta Sultanate.

He studied at the Rechts-Hogeschool (Law High School) in Batavia, specializing in socioeconomic affairs.

Career

Dutch East Indies era
Under the Dutch administration, Soemanang worked as a civil servant for the Semarang landraad. He also worked for the Japanese Consulate in Batavia between 1936 and 1940, where he was a translator. He then became the legal adviser for the Tjahaja Timoer newspaper.

In 1937, Soemanang (who had entered politics and joined the Gerindo political party) founded a weekly publication in Bogor, named Perantaraan. He later proposed the founding of a national news agency. Alongside other young politically active journalists such as Sanusi Pane and Adam Malik, they founded the Antara news agency which derived its name from Perantaraan. Soemanang became the agency's first chief editor. The following year, he left Antara and became the head of the  school replacing Amir Sjarifuddin. He continued to work in journalism, becoming the chief editor of the Pemandangan newspaper in 1940.

Sumanang participated in the First Indonesian Language Congress in Surakarta on 25 June 1938, which aimed to standardize the Indonesian language - then recently declared as the national language following the 1928 Youth Pledge. Sumanang had offered to gather influential businesspeople and scholars to the congress after a spontaneous request by fellow journalist Soedarjo Tjokrosisworo.

Japanese occupation
During the Japanese occupation of the Dutch East Indies, Soemanang worked in the Japanese-founded Asia Raya newspaper and later headed the press department of the labor organization . During this period, he had been arrested due to a photo published in Pemandangan showing the Japanese Emperor Hirohito obscured by the Japanese flag. Another incident close to the end of the war saw Soemanang arrested for another image of Hirohito stained by red ink from the flag, and resulted in the Japanese authorities forcing Pemandangan to be published as Pembangoenan.

Post-independence
Shortly after the proclamation of Indonesian independence, Sumanang co-founded the National Press Company (Badan Usaha Penerbitan Nasional). In 1946, the Indonesian Journalists Association was founded, and Soemanang was elected as its first chairman. He further founded the daily newspaper Nasional (today Bernas)  in Yogyakarta in November 1946, in addition to the magazines Wanita Indonesia and Revue Indonesia, and Javanese-language pamphlet Biwara.

Soemanang had also joined the Indonesian National Party, where he became the chair of its economic department in 1946. He was a member of the Central Indonesian National Committee, and he was later appointed as a representative of the Republic of Indonesia to the Senate of the United States of Indonesia, representing the Republic, in 1950, though the United States of Indonesia was defederalized six months after his appointment and Soemanang became a member of the Provisional People's Representative Council instead. He resigned on 13 March 1954. Soemanang was appointed as the Minister of Economic Affairs in the Wilopo Cabinet in April 1952. One of his policies was to return the oil wells in North Sumatra back to the control of Royal Dutch Shell, which faced fierce criticism from the parliament and he withdrew this decision. Additionally, alongside Interior Minister Mohammad Roem, Soemanang ordered the issuance of 50 million identity cards for registry purposes.

After his time as minister, Soemanang served as president director in the National Industrial Bank and the Indonesian Development Bank. He also served as an executive director in the International Monetary Fund for some time, representing Indonesia, Algeria, Ghana, Laos, Libya, Morocco and Tunisia. In 1979, he returned to the journalistic world, when he founded the short-lived magazines Sari Pers and Zaman in cooperation with the Tempo group.

He died in Jakarta on 13 June 1988. His grave is located in Yogyakarta.

References

Bibliography

1908 births
1988 deaths
20th-century journalists
Government ministers of Indonesia
Indonesian collaborators with Imperial Japan
Indonesian journalists
Indonesian National Party politicians
Indonesian newspaper editors
Members of Senate of the United States of Indonesia
Members of the People's Representative Council, 1950
Newspaper editors from the Dutch East Indies
Pemandangan people
People from Yogyakarta